The 1966 Orange Bowl was the 32nd edition of the college football bowl game, played at the Orange Bowl in Miami, Florida, on Saturday, January 1. The final game of the 1965–66 bowl season, it matched the third-ranked and undefeated Nebraska Cornhuskers of the Big Eight Conference and the #4 Alabama Crimson Tide of the Southeastern Conference (SEC).

This was the second year that the Orange Bowl was played at night on New Year's Day, after the other college football bowl games. Due to losses by both #1 Michigan State in the Rose Bowl and #2 Arkansas in the Cotton Bowl earlier in the day, the game had turned into a de facto national championship game, as the AP would be taking a final post-bowl vote for the first time ever. Slightly favored, Alabama won, 39–28.

Teams

Alabama

Nebraska

Game summary
Alabama scored first on a 32-yard touchdown pass from Steve Sloan to Ray Perkins. In the second quarter, Nebraska's Bob Churchich threw a 33-yard touchdown pass to Tony Jeter to tie the game at seven. Alabama's Les Kelly scored on a four-yard touchdown run as the Crimson Tide regained the lead at 14–7. Sloan and Perkins connected again from eleven yards out, then Alabama  recovered the ensuing onside kick; a 19-yard field goal David Ray in the final minute gave the Crimson Tide a commanding 24–7 lead at halftime.

In the third quarter, Churchich threw a 49-yard touchdown pass to Ben Gregory as Nebraska narrowed the deficit to 24–13. Steve Bowman scored from a yard out, and a successful two-point conversion, increased the Tide's lead to 32–13.

On the first play of the fourth quarter, Churchich ran in from a yard to make it 32–20. Alabama answered with a time-consuming drive, with Bowman scoring on a three-yard run, which put the lead back to nineteen points at 39–20 with just over eight minutes remaining. Churchich threw a 14-yard touchdown pass to Jeter with less than three minutes to go for the last score as Alabama  Quarterback Sloan was named the game's outstanding player.

Scoring
First quarter
Alabama – Ray Perkins 21-yard pass from Steve Sloan (David Ray kick), 9:36
Second quarter
Nebraska – Tony Jeter 33-yard pass from Bob Churchich (Larry Wachholtz kick), 12:15
Alabama – Les Kelley 4-yard run (Ray kick), 7:11
Alabama – Perkins 11-yard pass from Sloan (Ray kick), 1:42
Alabama – Ray 19-yard field goal, 0:34
Third quarter
Nebraska – Ben Gregory 49-yard pass from Churchich (pass failed), 9:35
Alabama – Steve Bowman 1-yard run (Perkins pass from Sloan), 4:29
Fourth quarter
Nebraska – Churchich 1-yard run (Wachholtz kick), 14:58
Alabama – Bowman 3-yard run (Ray kick), 8:13
Nebraska – Jeter 14-yard pass from Churchich (Gregory pass from Churchich), 2:50

Statistics
{| class=wikitable style="text-align:center"
! Statistics !! Alabama  !! Nebraska
|-
|First Downs || 29|| 17
|-
|Rushes–yards|| 57–222|| 24–145
|-
|Passing yards|| 296|| 232
|-
|Passes (C–A–I)|| 20–29–2 || 12–19–1
|-
|Total Offense || 86–518 || 43–377
|-
|Punts–average ||5–31.2|| 3–41.7
|-
|Fumbles–lost ||0–0|| 4–4
|-
|Turnovers|| 2 || 5
|-
|Penalties–yards ||8–62|| 8–86
|}

Aftermath
In the final AP poll, Alabama climbed to first for the national championship, while Nebraska dropped to fifth.

References

External links
 http://www.huskerpedia.com/games/1965/11alabama.html

1965–66 NCAA football bowl games
1966
1966
1966
January 1966 sports events in the United States
Orange Bowl